In physics, the Dember effect is when the electron current from a cathode  subjected to both illumination and a simultaneous electron bombardment is greater than the sum of the photoelectric current  and the secondary emission current .

History
Discovered by Harry Dember (1882–1943) in 1925, this effect is due to the sum of the excitations of an electron by two means: photonic illumination and electron bombardment (i.e. the sum of the two excitations extracts the electron). In Dember’s initial study, he referred only to metals; however, more complex materials have been analyzed since then.

Photoelectric effect
The photoelectric effect due to the illumination of the metallic surface extracts electrons (if the energy of the photon is greater than the extraction work) and excites the electrons which the photons don’t have the energy to extract.

In a similar process, the electron bombardment of the metal both extracts and excites electrons inside the metal.

 

If one considers  a constant and increases , it can be observed that  has a maximum of about 150 times .

See also
Anomalous photovoltaic effect
Photo-Dember

References

Further reading

External links
 :de:Harry Dember

Electrical phenomena